There is a small community of Tamils in Pakistan. Some Tamils migrated from the South Indian state of Tamil Nadu, and settled in Karachi after the independence in 1947. Although there also some Tamils that have been since early 20th century when Karachi was developed during the British Raj. There are also Sri Lankan Tamils that arrived during the Sri Lankan Civil War and these Tamils are mostly Hindus. The Madrasi Para area behind the Jinnah Post Graduate Medical Centre is home to 100 Tamil Hindu families. Population of Tamils in Pakistan are over 300-400+. The Shri Rama Pir Mandir Temple was located in this neighborhood demolished by a builder. The temple was the biggest Tamil Hindu temple in Karachi. In addition, Drigh Road and Korangi also have a Tamil population. There are also a small number of Tamil Christians in Karachi. Till August 2019, Pakistan receives 30 post office mails from Tamil Nadu every month.

Notable people
 Subrahmanyan Chandrasekhar, Indian-American Nobel laureate born in pre-independence Lahore
 Mani Shankar Aiyar, Indian diplomat and politician born in Lahore; served as Indian consul-general in Karachi from 1978 to 1982
 Victor Gnanapragasam, Catholic bishop

References

 
Pakistan
Muhajir people
Muhajir communities
Pakistan
Ethnic groups in Pakistan
Indian emigrants to Pakistan
Pakistani people of Indian descent